Kilgobbin Castle is a 15th-century castle in Dublin, Ireland.

Location

Kilgobbin Castle is located to the north of Stepaside and east of Two Rock, guarding the southern approach to Dublin from County Wicklow.

History
Archeological excavations have shown that the site of the castle was inhabited long before the castle was built; there is evidence of 11th–12th century metalworking, a 13th-century "plough pebble" and 13th–14th century pottery.

Kilgobbin Castle was built by the Cambro-Norman Walsh family , as one of the Pale towers built after King Henry VI, in 1429, awarded a grant of ten pounds to any man who built a castle on the edge of the Pale; it was one of several on the southern edge of The Pale. In 1476 the castle was sacked by the O'Byrnes.

In 1641 the Walshes were dispossessed, with the castle going to Adam Loftus, who then rented it to Mathew Talbot, an officer in the Confederate Irish Army, and the castle was an important site in the Irish Confederate Wars of the 1640s, including a skirmish near the castle in January 1642. After that war it was granted to Dr. John Harding of Trinity College, Dublin. In the 19th century it was owned by the Eustaces, the McDonnells and the judge and scholar Richard Nutley.

It was occupied by several further owners until falling into ruin by the early 19th century. Antiquarian John Lee visited Kilgobbin Castle in 1806–7 and noted it was formerly called Sesson Castle.

Local legend claimed Kilgobbin Castle was haunted by a man in a suit of armor and a woman who carried a bucket of water and rattled coins in her apron.

Building

The castle is a tall square tower; only two of the walls are still standing, the north and east walls having collapsed in 1832. The entrance is in the west wall. It is three storeys high with thick granite walls, arrow slits and a vaulted ground floor ceiling. A service tower on the southeast corner contains a spiral staircase and garderobe.

References

Castles in Dún Laoghaire–Rathdown
Reportedly haunted locations in Ireland
Towers completed in the 15th century
1470s establishments in Ireland
Archaeological sites in County Dublin